Matthew "Matt" Hebb is a freelance illustrator and American comic book artist, known for his work on creator-owned graphic novels for Arcana Comics and a comic based on DreamWorks' film, Home.

Career 
Matt Hebb has worked in various fields of the entertainment industry such as graphic design, storyboard for video games, comics, children's books, and trading card art. He attended Academy of Art University (AAU) from September 2000 to May 2005.

Bibliography

Arcana Studio 
 Harry Walton: Henchman for Hire (62 pages, 2011)
 Wonderdog Inc. (122 pages, 2010)

IDW Publishing 
 America's Army #0 (June 2013), #3 (May 2014)

Moonstone Books 
 Zombies vs Cheerleaders #1 (art), #3 (cover)

Titan Books 
 Home #1 (September 2015)

FriesenPress 
 Baby Bats Don't Hatch From Eggs (2015) 
 Benji Bat Wears Glasses (2015) 
 Carla the Clumsy Bat (2015)

Bongo Comics 
 Simpsons Comics #226 The Bullies! (pencils)
 Simpsons Comics #232 Are You Duff Enough (pencils)

References 

American comics artists